Rhamphomyia nitidula  is a species of fly in the family Empididae. It is found in the  Palearctic.

References

External links
Images representing Rhamphomyia at BOLD

Rhamphomyia
Insects described in 1842
Asilomorph flies of Europe